is a principle local road that stretches from Nishigotanda, Shinagawa in Tokyo to Kanagawa-ku, Yokohama in Kanagawa.

Route description
The Tokyo, Kawasaki and Yokohama sections of the road have a length of 7,210, 3,276,
and 9,540 m respectively.

References

Roads in Tokyo
Roads in Kanagawa Prefecture
Prefectural roads in Japan